The Finnish Touring Car Championship is a domestic saloon car series. As of the 2007 season it became eligible to become part of the FIA European Touring Car Cup.

Champions

References
2008 Finnish Super Touring Standings at DriverDB.com
Finland joins the FIA European Touring Car Championship
List of champions

Touring car racing series
Auto racing series in Finland